Mahaplaban Padak 1998 (Bengali: মহাপ্লাবন পদক ১৯৮৮), is a military medal of Bangladesh. The medal was established in 1998. The medal is intended for awarding servicemen who took part in the liquidation of the consequences of the flood of 1998.

References 

Military awards and decorations of Bangladesh